Paynesville is a city in Stearns County, Minnesota, United States, on Lake Koronis, in the central part of the state. The population was 2,388 at the 2020 census. It is part of the St. Cloud Metropolitan Statistical Area.

History
Paynesville was platted in 1857 by Edwin E. Payne, and named for him. A post office has been in operation at Paynesville since 1857.

Geography
Paynesville lies along the North Fork of the Crow River and Lake Koronis.

Demographics

2010 census
As of the census of 2010, there were 2,432 people, 1,065 households, and 635 families living in the city. The racial makeup of the city was 97.0% White, 0.5% African American, 0.1% Native American, 0.4% Asian, 0.9% from other races, and 1.1% from two or more races. Hispanic or Latino of any race were 2.2% of the population.

There were 1,065 households, of which 26.9% had children under the age of 18 living with them, 46.9% were married couples living together, 7.1% had a female householder with no husband present, 5.6% had a male householder with no wife present, and 40.4% were non-families. 35.8% of all households were made up of individuals, and 20.4% had someone living alone who was 65 years of age or older. The average household size was 2.20 and the average family size was 2.83.

The median age in the city was 42.4 years. 22.1% of residents were under the age of 18; 6.9% were between the ages of 18 and 24; 23.6% were from 25 to 44; 21.9% were from 45 to 64; and 25.3% were 65 years of age or older. The gender makeup of the city was 47.7% male and 52.3% female.

2000 census
As of the census of 2000, there were 2,267 people, 934 households, and 594 families living in the city. The racial makeup of the city was 98.81% White, 0.04% African American, 0.09% Native American, 0.31% Asian, 0.22% from other races, and 0.53% from two or more races. Hispanic or Latino of any race were 1.28% of the population.

There were 934 households, out of which 28.2% had children under the age of 18 living with them, 54.1% were married couples living together, 6.7% had a female householder with no husband present, and 36.4% were non-families. 32.9% of all households were made up of individuals, and 20.0% had someone living alone who was 65 years of age or older. The average household size was 2.32 and the average family size was 2.95.

In the city, the population was spread out, with 23.0% under the age of 18, 8.8% from 18 to 24, 24.2% from 25 to 44, 18.9% from 45 to 64, and 25.1% who were 65 years of age or older. The median age was 40. For every 100 females, there were 88.3 males. For every 100 females age 18 and over, there were 82.0 males.

The median income for a household in the city was $34,000, and the median income for a family was $42,500. Males had a median income of $30,978 versus $20,219 for females. The per capita income for the city was $17,246. About 4.5% of families and 8.1% of the population were below the poverty line, including 4.6% of those under age 18 and 15.2% of those age 65 or over.

Infrastructure

Transportation
Minnesota State Highways 4, 23, and 55 are three of Paynesville's main highways. Freight rail service is provided by the Soo Line's Paynesville Subdivision. Passenger rail service was formerly provided by the Great Northern Railway and by the Soo Line's Winnipeger until 1970; since then the nearest active train station to Paynesville has been in St. Cloud.

The City of Paynesville operates Paynesville Municipal Airport (PEX/KPEX), a small general aviation airport.

Area lakes

Lake Koronis
One mile south of Paynesville, the 3014-acre Lake Koronis offers some of the best fishing in the area, with an abundance of walleye, bass, and northern pike.
It reaches a maximum depth of 132 feet and averages 29 feet deep. Aquatic invasive species currently found in the lake include Starry Stonewort and Zebra Mussels.

Rice Lake
About five miles east-southeast of Paynesville, the 1639-acre Rice Lake also offers excellent walleye, bass, and northern pike fishing. There is public lake access on the northwest shore, at the end of 180th Street, and on the southwest shore, at the end of 253rd Avenue.

References

External links
City Website
Paynesville Area Online website - Link
City-Data.com
ePodunk: Profile for Paynesville, Minnesota

Cities in Stearns County, Minnesota
Cities in Minnesota
St. Cloud, Minnesota metropolitan area
Populated places established in 1857
1857 establishments in Minnesota Territory